The 1969 Isle of Man TT, the fourth round of the 1969 Grand Prix motorcycle racing season, involved a number of races on the Mountain Course on the Isle of Man. For the second year running Giacomo Agostini won both the Junior and Senior races, completing the six laps of the latter race in 2:09.40.2 to win by almost nine minutes. There were three "production" categories; Malcolm Uphill won the 750 cc, Graham Penny the 500 cc and Mike Rogers the 250 cc. German pairs won both sidecar events; Klaus Enders and Ralf Engelhardt in the 500 cc and Siegfried Schauzu and H.Schneider in the 750 cc. Kel Carruthers won the Lightweight 250 cc race, while Dave Simmonds won the Lightweight 125 cc.

1969 Isle of Man Production 750 cc TT final standings
3 Laps (113.00 Miles) Mountain Course.

1969 Isle of Man Production 500 cc TT final standings
3 Laps (113.00 Miles) Mountain Course.

1969 Isle of Man Production 250 cc TT final standings
3 Laps (113.00 Miles) Mountain Course.

1969 Isle of Man Sidecar 500 cc TT final standings
3 Laps (113.2 Miles) Mountain Course.

1969 Isle of Man Sidecar 750 cc TT final standings
3 Laps (113.00 Miles) Mountain Course.

1969 Isle of Man Lightweight TT 250 cc final standings
6 Laps (226.38 Miles) Mountain Course.

1969 Isle of Man Lightweight TT 125 cc final standings
3 Laps (113.00 Miles) Mountain Course.

1969 Isle of Man Junior TT 350 cc final standings
6 Laps (236.38 Miles) Mountain Course.

1969 Isle of Man Senior TT 500 cc final standings
6 Laps (236.38 Miles) Mountain Course.

External links
 Detailed race results
 Mountain Course map

Isle of Man Tt
Tourist Trophy
Isle of Man TT
Isle of Man TT